AIMS or Aims may refer to:

Education 
 Acharya Institute of Management and Sciences, Bangalore, Karnataka, India
 Adventist International Mission School, Muak Lek, Thailand
 African Institute for Mathematical Sciences, Cape Town, South Africa
 Aims Community College, Colorado United States
 American Indian Model Schools, a charter school system based in Oakland, California
 Amrita Institute of Medical Sciences, Kochi, Kerala, India
 Arabic Immersion Magnet School, Houston, Texas, United States
 Arizona's Instrument to Measure Standards, a standardized test administered by the state of Arizona, United States
 Asian Institute of Maritime Studies, a campus in Pasay, Philippines
 Australian Institute of Marine Science, a tropical marine research centre located primarily at Cape Ferguson, Queensland

Business and NGO 
 Afghanistan Information Management Services, an Afghan NGO providing services to the Afghan government and to the development community
 Association of International Marathons and Distance Races
 Association of Internes and Medical Students
 Atlantic Institute for Market Studies, a Canadian conservative think tank and public policy forum

Firearms and military equipment
Pistol Mitralieră model 1963/1965, a Romanian derivative of the AKM, exported as the AIMS.

Sports
 Alabama International Motor Speedway, the former name of Talladega Superspeedway
 Alliance of Independent recognised Members of Sport, an affiliate of the Global Association of International Sports Federations
 Australian International Motor Show

Other uses 
 Aims (album), by Vienna Teng
 Agricultural Information Management Standards, a web portal managed by the Food and Agriculture Organization of the United Nations
 Airplane Information Management System, the "brains" of Boeing 777 aircraft
 Anesthesia Information Management System, an information technology system that is used as an electronic anesthesia record and allows the collection and analysis of anesthesia-related data
 Associated Iron Moulders of Scotland, a former trade union
Advanced Impact Media Solutions

See also 
 AIIMS
 AIM (disambiguation)